In This Our Life is a 1941 novel by the American writer Ellen Glasgow. It won the Pulitzer Prize for the Novel in 1942. The title is a quote from the sonnet sequence Modern Love by George Meredith: "Ah, what a dusty answer gets the soul/ When hot for certainties in this our life!"

Film adaptation
In 1941 Warner Brothers purchased the film rights for $40,000 and quickly began casting the film In This Our Life. In the end, the film starred Bette Davis and Olivia de Havilland as the sisters.  Screenwriter Howard Koch adapted the novel for the screen, downplaying the incestuous aspect of William Fitzroy's relationship with his niece Stanley, and the portrayal of contemporary racial discrimination in the South.  Koch also gave the characters played by Olivia de Havilland and George Brent a happy ending, together, that does not occur in the novel.

Notes

1941 American novels
Pulitzer Prize for the Novel-winning works
American novels adapted into films
Jonathan Cape books